The Aer-Pegaso M-100 was a single-seat glider designed and built in Italy from 1957.

Development 
The Morelli M-100 was a single-seat sailplane designed in response to a 1956 competition sponsored by the Aero Club d'Italia for a low-cost training glider. The winning design, by Prof. Ing. Piero Morelli, was put into production the following year. As originally designed, the M-100 was of conventional, high-wing sailplane configuration, with a stubby T-tail.

In 1958, the FAI published the new Standard Class rules for sailplanes, and since the M-100 was close to this specification, the design was modified to comply. This involved numerous changes to the wing, including lengthening and thickening the structure, and adding larger and more numerous rotating airbrake segments. The tail unit was revised too, and given a conventional fin. This version was designated the M-100S.

The M-100 and M-100S were manufactured by Aeromere, CVT, Avionautica Rio in Italy, and S.A. CARMAM, in France as the CARMAM M-100S Mésange (tomtit). Eighty three aircraft were built in Italy and a further 140 at CARMAM in France.

Variants 
Morelli M-100 A generic designation for all variants.
CVT M-100Prototype and initial production at the Centro di Volo a Vela del Politecnico di Torino (CVT) in Turin, in the Ditta Nicolotti & Figli factory in Turin.
Morelli M-100S A substantial re-design to comply with new Standard class specifications issued in 1957.
Aeromere M-100S The bulk of production from the Aeromere factory.
Avionautica Rio M-100S Alternative production in Italy
CARMAM M-100S Mésange (Tomtit) Production at the CARMAM (Coopérative d'Approvisionnement et de Réparation de Matériel Aéronautique de Moulins) factory in France, (140 built).
Aer-Pegaso M-100S Another designation for some aircraft built in Italy.

Specifications (M-100S)

See also

References

Notes

Bibliography

 Coates, Andrew. Jane's World Sailplanes & Motor Gliders new edition. London, Jane's. 1980. 
 Taylor, J. H. (ed) (1989) Jane's Encyclopedia of Aviation. Studio Editions: London. p. 29
 Historical Aircraft Group, Italy website

Glider aircraft
1950s Italian sailplanes
M-100
High-wing aircraft
Aircraft first flown in 1957